In the Mix is an album by pianist John Hicks, recorded in 1994.

Recording and music
The album was recorded at Systems Two in Brooklyn, New York, on November 13, 1994. The five musicians were Vincent Herring (alto and soprano sax), Elise Wood (flute), John Hicks (piano), Curtis Lundy (bass), and Cecil Brooks III (drums). Half of the eight tracks were written by Hicks.

Release
In the Mix was released by Landmark Records.

Track listing
"In the Mix" (John Hicks)
"Yemenja" (Hicks)
"Elation" (Vincent Herring)
"Soul Eyes" (Mal Waldron)
"Motivation" (Hicks)
"Weaver of Dreams" (Jack Elliott, Victor Young)
"Mind Wine" (Hicks)
"Once in a While" (Michael Edwards, Bud Green)

Personnel
Vincent Herring – alto sax, soprano sax
Elise Wood – flute
John Hicks – piano
Curtis Lundy – bass
Cecil Brooks III – drums

References

1994 albums
John Hicks (jazz pianist) albums
Landmark Records albums